The Inferior Sex is a 1920 American drama film directed by Joseph Henabery and written by Keene Thompson and Waldemar Young. It is based on the 1910 play The Inferior Sex by Frank Slayton. The film stars Mildred Harris, Milton Sills, Mary Alden, John Steppling, Bertram Grassby and James O. Barrows. The film was released on March 8, 1920, by First National Exhibitors' Circuit.

Cast
Mildred Harris as Allisa Randall
Milton Sills as Knox Randall
Mary Alden as Clarissa Mott-Smith
John Steppling as George Mott / Smith
Bertram Grassby as Porter Maddox
James O. Barrows as Captain Andy Drake

References

External links
 

1920 films
1920s English-language films
Silent American drama films
1920 drama films
First National Pictures films
Films directed by Joseph Henabery
American silent feature films
American black-and-white films
1920s American films